Ash Sharyah District  is a district of the Al Bayda Governorate, Yemen. As of 2003, the district had a population of 33,873 inhabitants.

References

Districts of Al Bayda Governorate
Ash Sharyah District